"You'll Be Back (Every Night in My Dreams)" is a song written by Wayland Holyfield and American country music singer Johnny Russell, and originally recorded by Russell. He released it for Polydor Records in 1978, charting at number 24 on Hot Country Songs.

Conway Twitty covered the song on his 1980 album, Rest Your Love on Me.

The song is most recognized by the cover released by American country music group The Statler Brothers in March 1982 as the third single from their album Years Ago. Their version of the song peaked at number 3 on the Billboard Hot Country Singles chart.

Chart performance

Johnny Russell

The Statler Brothers

Year-end charts

References

1978 songs
1978 singles
1982 singles
Johnny Russell (singer) songs
Conway Twitty songs
The Statler Brothers songs
Mercury Records singles
Polydor Records singles
Song recordings produced by Jerry Kennedy
Songs written by Wayland Holyfield
Songs written by Johnny Russell (singer)